This is a partial list of parks, public squares and protected areas in and around Metro Manila, Philippines.

Urban parks

Nature parks

Nature reserves

Notable plazas

Community parks and squares

References

 
Parks
Manila
Geography of Metro Manila
Tourist attractions in Metro Manila